The ash-breasted antbird (Myrmoborus lugubris) is an insectivorous bird in the antbird family, Thamnophilidae. It is found in Brazil, Colombia, Ecuador, and Peru. Its natural habitat is subtropical or tropical moist lowland forests.

The ash-breasted antbird was described by the German ornithologist Jean Cabanis in 1847 and given the binomial name Myrmonax lugubris. The current genus Myrmoborus was introduced in 1860.

References

Myrmoborus
Birds described in 1847
Birds of the Amazon Basin
Taxonomy articles created by Polbot